The Ministry of Trade is a government ministry office of the Republic of Turkey, responsible for customs and trade related affairs in Turkey. The ministry is headed by Mehmet Muş.

The ministry was founded with the Act No. 640 by merging the Prime Ministry's Undersecretariate of Customs with some departments of the former Ministry of Industry and Trade on 8 June 2011. In the past, duties of the current ministry were carried out by the Ministry of Customs and Monopoly (1931–1983), Ministry of Finance and Customs (1983–1991) and Undersecretariate of Customs (1993–2011). The first minister of the newly established ministry became Hayati Yazıcı, who served as the undersecretary before. Between 2011 and 2018, its official name was Ministry of Customs and Trade. It merged with Ministry of Economy in 2018 and rebranded as Ministry of Trade.

References

 
Turkey, Customs and Trade
2011 establishments in Turkey
Customs services